Dryalos (Δρύαλος) or Dry (Δρυ) is a village in the municipal unit of Oitylo, Laconia, Peloponnese, Greece. 

Notes

External links
 Official site

Populated places in Laconia
Populated places in the Mani Peninsula
East Mani